80th Brigade may refer to:
 80th Indian Infantry Brigade
 80th Motorized Infantry Brigade (People's Republic of China)
 80th Arctic Motor Rifle Brigade (Russia)
 80th Mixed Brigade (Spain)
 80th Air Assault Brigade (Ukraine)
 80th Anti-Aircraft Brigade (United Kingdom)
 80th Brigade (United Kingdom)